Rafał Hawel (born 11 September 1984) is a Polish badminton player from the SKB Piast Słupsk team. Hawel started his junior career as Technik Głubczyce player, and at the Polish Junior championships, he won the boys' singles and doubles title in 2002 and 2003. He also won the bronze medal at the 2003 European Junior Championships. In the senior event, he won the national championships in 2006 partnered with Przemysław Wacha in the men's doubles and in 2011 with Kamila Augustyn in the mixed doubles event.

Achievements

European Junior Championships 
Boys' singles

BWF International Challenge/Series 
Men's singles

Men's doubles

Mixed doubles

  BWF International Challenge tournament
  BWF International Series tournament

References

External links 

 

1984 births
Living people
Place of birth missing (living people)
Polish male badminton players